The 2021 AFC Champions League was the 40th edition of Asia's premier club football tournament organized by the Asian Football Confederation (AFC), and the 19th under the current AFC Champions League title.

Al-Hilal won their fourth title by defeating Pohang Steelers 2–0 in the final, becoming the most successful team in the history of the competition. As winners, they automatically qualified for the 2022 AFC Champions League (although they had already qualified through their domestic performance). They also earned the right to play in the 2021 FIFA Club World Cup in the United Arab Emirates.

The tournament was the first to involve 40 teams during the group stage, with an increase from the previous 32 teams.

Ulsan Hyundai of South Korea were the defending champions, but were eliminated in the semi-finals by fellow South Korean club Pohang Steelers.

Association team allocation
The 46 AFC member associations (excluding the Northern Mariana Islands, which became a full member in December 2020 and are not eligible for this season) are ranked based on their clubs' performance over the last four years in AFC competitions (their national team's FIFA World Rankings no longer considered). The slots are allocated by the following criteria according to the Entry Manual:
The associations are split into two regions (Article 3.1):
West Region consists of the 25 associations from the West Asian Football Federation (WAFF), the South Asian Football Federation (SAFF), and the Central Asian Football Association (CAFA).
East Region consists of the 21 associations from the ASEAN Football Federation (AFF) and the East Asian Football Federation (EAFF).
The AFC may reallocate one or more associations to another region if necessary for sporting reasons.
The top 12 associations in each region are eligible to enter the AFC Champions League.
In each region, there are five groups in the group stage, including 16 direct slots, with the 4 remaining slots filled through qualifying play-offs (Article 3.2). The slots in each region are distributed as follows:
The associations ranked 1st and 2nd are each allocated three direct slots and one play-off slot.
The associations ranked 3rd and 4th are each allocated two direct slots and two play-off slots.
The associations ranked 5th are each allocated one direct slot and two play-off slots.
The associations ranked 6th are each allocated one direct slot and one play-off slot.
The associations ranked 7th to 10th are each allocated one direct slot.
The associations ranked 11th to 12th are each allocated one play-off slot.
The AFC Champions League title holders and AFC Cup title holders are each allocated one play-off slot should they not qualify for the tournament through domestic performance (Article 3.6). However, there are no AFC Cup title holders for this season as the 2020 AFC Cup was cancelled due to the COVID-19 pandemic. The following rules are applied:
If the AFC Champions League title holders or AFC Cup title holders are from associations ranked 1st to 6th, their association is allocated the same number of play-off slots, and they replace the lowest-seeded team from their association. Otherwise, their association is allocated one additional play-off slot, and they do not replace any team from their association (Articles 3.8, 3.9 and 3.10).
If both the AFC Champions League title holders and AFC Cup title holders are from the same association which is allocated only one play-off slot, their association is allocated one additional play-off slot, and only the lowest-seeded team from their association is replaced as a result (Article 3.11).
The AFC Champions League title holders and AFC Cup title holders are the lowest-seeded teams in the qualifying play-offs if they do not replace any team from their association (Article 3.12).
If any association ranked 1st to 6th do not fulfill any one of the AFC Champions League criteria, they have all their direct slots converted into play-off slots. The direct slots given up are redistributed to the highest eligible association by the following criteria (Articles 3.13 and 3.14):
For each association, the maximum number of total slots is four and the maximum number of direct slots is three (Articles 3.4 and 3.5).
If any association ranked 3rd to 6th is allocated one additional direct slot, one play-off slot is annulled and not redistributed.
If any association ranked 5th to 6th is allocated two additional direct slots, one play-off slot is annulled and not redistributed.
If any association ranked 7th to 10th do not fulfill any one of the AFC Champions League criteria, they have their direct slot converted into play-off slot. The direct slot given up is redistributed to the next association ranked 11th or 12th, whose play-off slot is annulled and not redistributed, or if neither are eligible, the highest eligible association by the same criteria as mentioned above (Articles 3.16 and 3.17).
If any association with only play-off slot(s), including any association ranked 11th to 12th or those mentioned above, do not fulfill the minimum AFC Champions League criteria, the play-off slot(s) are annulled and not redistributed (Articles 3.19 and 3.20).
For each association, the maximum number of total slots is one-third of the total number of eligible teams (excluding foreign teams) in the top division (Article 3.4). If this rule is applied, any direct slots given up are redistributed by the same criteria as mentioned above, and play-off slots are annulled and not redistributed (Article 9.10).
All participating teams must be granted an AFC Champions League license, and apart from cup winners, finish in the top half of their top division (Articles 7.1 and 9.5). If any association do not have enough teams which satisfy this criteria, any direct slots given up are redistributed by the same criteria as mentioned above, and play-off slots are annulled and not redistributed (Article 9.9).
If any team granted a license refuses to participate, their slot, either direct or play-off, is annulled and not redistributed (Article 9.11).

Association ranking
For the 2021 AFC Champions League, the associations are allocated slots according to their association ranking which was published on 29 November 2019, which takes into account their performance in the AFC Champions League and the AFC Cup during the period between 2016 and 2019.

Notes

Teams
In the following table, the number of appearances and last appearance count only those since the 2002–03 season (including qualifying rounds), when the competition was rebranded as the AFC Champions League.

Notes

Schedule
The schedule of the competition is as follows.

On 25 January 2021, the AFC published the schedule of the competition. The group stage is played as centralized double round-robin tournament, and the round of 16 and quarter-finals are played as a single match.

Notes:
W: West Region
E: East Region

The original schedule of the competition, as planned before the pandemic, was as follows.

Qualifying play-offs

Preliminary round

Play-off round

Group stage

Group A

Group B

Group C

Group D

Group E

Group F

Group G

Group H

Group I

Group J

Ranking of second-placed teams

West Region

East Region

Knockout stage

Bracket

Round of 16

Quarter-finals

Semi-finals

Final

Top scorers

See also
2021 AFC Cup
2021 AFC Women's Club Championship

Notes

References

External links

AFC Champions League 2021, stats.the-AFC.com

1
 
2021
Association football events postponed due to the COVID-19 pandemic